Edward William Bender (June 15, 1930 – April 10, 2015) was an American football player and coach. He served as the head football coach at the University of Wisconsin–Superior from 1972 to 1974, compiling a record of 4–26. He played college football at Northeast Missouri State College (now known as Truman State University) in Kirksville, Missouri.

Head coaching record

College

References

1930 births
2015 deaths
American football quarterbacks
Truman Bulldogs football players
Wisconsin–Superior Yellowjackets football coaches
High school football coaches in Illinois
High school football coaches in Missouri
Sportspeople from Chicago
Players of American football from Chicago